Temryuk is a town and the administrative center of Temryuksky District in Krasnodar Krai, Russia, located on the Taman Peninsula on the right bank of the Kuban River not far from its entry into the Temryuk Bay, amid a field of mud volcanoes. Population: 41,413 (2020),    26,600 (1975).

History
Tens of thousands of years ago, the Azov Sea was much larger and covered the delta of the Kuban River. Deposition of silt by the Kuban gradually pushed out the sea and shaped the delta with numerous shallow estuaries. Frequent eruptions of the mud volcanoes contributed to this deposition process. There are about 25 mud volcanoes in the area and some are still active.

Situated close to the site of ancient Tmutarakan, Temryuk was vied by various powers as a vantage point at the mouth of the Kuban River. The first recorded settlement on the site was Tumnev, a Tatar fortress, which passed to the Genoese merchants in the 14th century. It was known as Copa until occupied by the Crimean Khanate in 1483.

The Russians, allied with a local potentate, Temryuk of Kabardia, captured Tumnev and built a fortress called New Temryuk there. The Crimean Tatars retook the fort in 1570; it was known as Adis for a century to come. In the 18th century, the site was settled by the Cossacks, whose stanitsa was incorporated as the town of Temryuk in 1860.
. The Germans took the Kuban Gorge (General Konrad Pass) and the town of Temyruk in 1942–43.

Economy

The port of Temryuk is situated 4 kilometers (2.5 mi) from the town itself. The port is home to a large liquefied petroleum gas facility.

Administrative and municipal status
Within the framework of administrative divisions, Temryuk serves as the administrative center of Temryuksky District. As an administrative division, it is, together with three rural localities, incorporated within Temryuksky District as the Town of Temryuk. As a municipal division, the Town of Temryuk is incorporated within Temryuksky Municipal District as Temryukskoye Urban Settlement.

Gallery

References

Notes

Sources

External links

Cities and towns in Krasnodar Krai
Temryuksky District
History of Kuban
Port cities and towns of the Azov Sea
Port cities and towns in Russia